The 12825 / 12826 Jharkhand Sampark Kranti Express is an Indian Express train. It was introduced along with other Sampark Kranti Expresses during 2003–04.

Service
Twice weekly from Ranchi to New Delhi, the capital of India, via the Grand Chord route.

Timetable
 No. 12825 departs from Ranchi Junction at 23:40 and arrives Anand Vihar Terminal at 19:10.
 No. 12826 departs from Anand Vihar Terminal at 07:00 and arrives Ranchi Junction at 04:05.

Route & halts

Coach composition
SLR-2, 2AC-1, 3AC-1, SL-5, PC-1, GEN-4

Locomotive 
On the entire route, the train is hauled by a WAP-7 locomotive from Ghaziabad loco shed.

Transport in Ranchi
Transport in Delhi
Sampark Kranti Express trains
Rail transport in Jharkhand
Rail transport in Uttar Pradesh
Rail transport in Delhi
Railway services introduced in 2005